Hoholiv is a former Cossack town, and present day village, in Brovary Raion, Kyiv Oblast of Ukraine. It belongs to Velyka Dymerka settlement hromada, one of the hromadas of Ukraine.

History 
Some historians trace the origins of the town to the town Nosov on the Rud river, mentioned in ancient Russian chronicles of about 1148 CE.

17th to 19th centuries 
Intensive development of the town began from the beginning of the 17th century, when it was mentioned in the sources of Polish–Lithuanian Commonwealth under the name Chocholiw. At that time it was big free Cossack town situated on the trade roots near Kyiv.

In 1649 Hoholiv Cossack sotnia (military troop of hundred men) was formed to fight for freedom and civil liberties in Cossack army of Bohdan Khmelnytsky.

After the incorporation of the lands of Cossack Hetmanate into the Muscovy in the second half of 17th century chronicles of that period mention Cossack insurgency against czarist government of that time near the village. A lot of people were killed by troops of the Muscovite Army who oppressed the insurgents.

During the 17th to 19th centuries the town was part of the Russian Empire. Almost all citizens were registered as the imperial registry as Cossacks - that is more free than enslaved Cossack-peasants, which constituted the majority of the Ukrainian population at that time.

20th century 
After dissolution of the Russian Empire, the Russian civil war in 1917-23 and creation of the Soviet Ukraine, Hoholiv lost its status as a town and became a village.

21st century 
Modern people of village community preserve the memory of their forefathers Cossacks, free people by the will of God, people who made great impact to the development of the region, and gave names to most part of its towns and villages.

References

External links
 Hoholiv at the Internet handbook of cities and towns of the Ukrainian SSR
 Official website of the Hoholiv rural community

Villages in Brovary Raion
Ostyorsky Uyezd